The Calgary Roughnecks are a lacrosse team based in Calgary, Alberta playing in the National Lacrosse League (NLL). The 2007 season was the 6th in franchise history. The Roughnecks finished 2nd in the western division with a 9-7 record but were eliminated in the first round of the playoffs by the Arizona Sting.

Regular season

Conference standings

Game log
Reference:

Playoffs

Game log
Reference:

Player stats
Reference:

Runners (Top 10)

Note: GP = Games played; G = Goals; A = Assists; Pts = Points; LB = Loose Balls; PIM = Penalty minutes

Goaltenders
Note: GP = Games played; MIN = Minutes; W = Wins; L = Losses; GA = Goals against; Sv% = Save percentage; GAA = Goals against average

Awards

Roster
Reference:

See also
2007 NLL season

References

Calgary